Prostanthera melissifolia, commonly known as balm mint bush, is a species of flowering plant in the family Lamiaceae and is endemic to south-eastern Australia. It is an erect shrub with hairy branches, egg-shaped leaves with fine teeth on the edges and mauve to purple or pink flowers on the ends of branchlets.

Description
There are fine teeth on the edges of the leaves and the midrid and veins are hairy. Flowering occurs in spring.

Taxonomy and naming
Prostanthera melissifolia was first formally described in 1858 by Ferdinand von Mueller in Fragmenta Phytographiae Australiae. The specific epithet (melissifolia) is in reference to the foliage resembling Melissa, a genus of perennial herbs.

Distribution and habitat
Balm mint bush grows in tall montane forests between the Otway and Strzelecki Ranges in Victoria and on the far south coast of New South Wales.

References

melissifolia
Flora of New South Wales
Flora of Victoria (Australia)
Lamiales of Australia
Plants described in 1858
Taxa named by Ferdinand von Mueller